Mubarakan is a 2017 Indian Hindi-language romantic comedy film directed by Anees Bazmee. The film stars Anil Kapoor, Arjun Kapoor (in a dual role), Ileana D'Cruz, Athiya Shetty, Neha Sharma, Karan Kundra and Ratna Pathak Shah in the lead roles with Sanjay Kapoor in a special appearance. The storyline revolves around twin brothers, both played by Arjun Kapoor in his second-ever dual role. The film released theatrically worldwide on 28 July 2017 in 2350 screens in India and 475 screens overseas.

Plot
Avtar Singh Bajwa, his wife and their twin sons meet with a car accident, which kills Avtar and his wife though the twins survive. They are sent to Avtar's brother Kartar, a confirmed bachelor, who gives first son Karan to his London-based sister, Jeeto, and second son Charan to his Punjab-settled brother, Baldev.

23 years later

Karan and Charan are grown up respectively in London and Punjab. Karan loves the hot and gorgeous Supreet "Sweety" Kaur Gill from 2 years but Jeeto's husband, Paramjeet Sood, sets him to wed Binkle, the daughter of Paramjeet's business partner Akalpreet Sandhu. To marry Sweety, Karan asks Baldev to make Charan marry Binkle. In Punjab, Charan is dating a Muslim, Nafisa Qureshi, but hasn't told this to Baldev as he is biased against Muslims. He takes Charan to London.

Charan tells about Nafisa to Kartar, who suggests him to act as a drug addict in front of the Sandhus to break the alliance. Charan does this but falls for Binkle at first sight. Her brother Manpreet, due to a misunderstanding, assumes him to be druggist. Upset, Baldev misbehaves with Akalpreet and Jeeto later insults him. He severs ties with her and decides to come back to Punjab. As Charan is back with Nafisa, so he asks Karan to bring her at airport to talk about her to Baldev. Karan brings Nafisa but Charan terrifies to speak.

Due to this Baldev assumes Nafisa as Karan's girlfriend. As he hears Sweety's father Kuljeet pleading for her wedding, he takes Charan's proposal for Sweety. She is upset at Karan. Jeeto sets him to marry Binkle. As Baldev arranges destination marriage in London, everyone arrives there. Charan reveals to Binkle about Sweety and Karan, falling again for her. Nafisa reaches London. She and Manpreet fall in love. Charan reveals he also loves Binkle now and isn't drug addict.

Kartar refuses to help Karan, Sweety, Charan, Binkle, Manpreet and Nafisa. 25 December, the wedding day arrives when Karan and Charan exchange their sherwanis. Sweety reveals her love for Karan, shocking everyone. Kartar explains Jeeto and Baldev to stop arguing and be silly. They patch up. Kartar orders Karan and Charan to have original identities. So, the film ends happily; Karan weds Sweety and Charan weds Binkle.

Cast
 Arjun Kapoor in dual role as
Karan Sood / Karan Singh Bajwa: Avtaar and Jugni's son; Charan's identical twin brother and foster cousin; Paramjeet and Jeeto's adopted son; Jeeto, Kartar and Baldev's nephew; Binkle's ex-fiancé; Sweety's husband
Charan Singh Bajwa: Avtaar and Jugni's son; Karan's identical twin brother and foster cousin; Baldev's adopted son; Jeeto, Kartar and Baldev's nephew; Nafisa's ex-boyfriend; Sweety's ex-fiancé; Binkle's husband 
 Anil Kapoor as Kartar Singh Bajwa: Jeeto, Avtaar and Baldev's brother; Karan and Charan's paternal uncle
 Ileana D'Cruz as Supreet "Sweety" Kaur Gill Bajwa: Kuljeet's daughter; Charan's ex-fiancé; Karan's wife
 Athiya Shetty as Binkle Sandhu Bajwa: Akalpreet's daughter; Manpreet's sister; Karan's ex-fiancé; Charan's wife
 Karan Kundrra as Manpreet Sandhu: Akalpreet's son; Binkle's brother; Nafisa's husband
 Neha Sharma as Nafisa Qureshi Sandhu: Advocate; Charan's former love interest and ex-fiancé; Manpreet's wife
 Rahul Dev as Akalpreet Sandhu: Binkle and Manpreet's father
 Gurpal Singh as Kuljeet Singh Gill: Sweety's father
 Ratna Pathak Shah as Arshveer "Jeeto" Kaur Bajwa Sood: Kartar, Avtaar and Baldev's sister; Paramjeet's wife; Karan and Charan's fraternal aunt; Karan's foster mother
 Pavan Malhotra as Baldev Singh Bajwa: Jeeto, Kartar and Avtaar's brother; Karan and Charan's paternal uncle; Charan's foster father
 Lalit Parimoo as Paramjeet Singh Sood: Jeeto's husband; Karan and Charan's fraternal uncle; Karan's foster father
 Sanjay Kapoor in special appearance as Avtaar Singh Bajwa: Jeeto, Kartar and Baldev's brother; Jugni's husband; Karan and Charan's biological father 
 Alexander Dolbenko as Jolly
 Krishan Tandon as Trilochan

Production
The Guru Nanak Darbar Gurdwara in Gravesend, Kent features as the temple the families worship. The film is originally scheduled to release on 10 August 2015.

Soundtrack 

The music of the film has been composed by Amaal Mallik, Gourov Roshin, Rishi Rich and while the lyrics have been penned by Kumaar. Its first song "Mubarakan (Title Track)" was released on 22 June 2017. The second single titled as "Hawa Hawa" which is sung by Mika Singh and Prakriti Kakar was released on 29 June 2017. This was the copy of Pakistani singer singer Hasan jehangir song. The soundtrack was unveiled on 6 July 2017 by T-Series which consists 6 songs.

Critical reception 
Rohit Vats of Hindustan Times rated it 3/5 and felt that the lead actor, Arjun Kapoor, was overshadowed by Anil Kapoor: "It’s just that Anil Kapoor is a pro at it and steals all the limelight from him (Arjun).....You’ll be occasionally laughing, but probably won’t be leaving the theatre with a big smile on your face.

Meena Lyer of Times of India rated the film 3/5 and concluded: "Anil is the scene-stealer with his half Brit-half Punjabi act lifting the film throughout. Arjun’s double-act allows for some smiles and the girls, Ileana, Athiya and Neha are easy on the eye, though they’re just decorative set-pieces."

Manju Ramanan of Masala! gave the film 3.5/5 saying, "Loud characters, bright sets, songs and dances and slapstick humour dominate this Anees Bazmee film. But the instances do make you smile.

Ahana Bhattacharya of Koimoi gave the film 3/5 saying, "The story is funny and the film has some really hilarious dialogues. However, Sardar jokes are a bit clichéd and Bollywood needs to get over it. I loved the way the film builds up the confusion but it tends to drag towards the climax. There are moments when you will feel it is patriarchal, racist and regressive. Also, the climax is a bit predictable.

References

External links
 
 

Columbia Pictures films
2017 films
Films scored by Rishi Rich
Films scored by Amaal Mallik
Films scored by Gourov Roshin
2010s Hindi-language films
Films shot in Mumbai
Films shot in Punjab, India
Films shot in London
Films shot in England
Twins in Indian films
Films directed by Anees Bazmee
Films scored by Amar Mohile
Sony Pictures Networks India films
Sony Pictures films